Metacosma is a genus of moths belonging to the subfamily Olethreutinae of the family Tortricidae.

Species
Metacosma impolitana Kuznetzov, 1985
Metacosma miratorana Kuznetzov, 1988

See also
List of Tortricidae genera

References

External links
tortricidae.com

Tortricidae genera
Olethreutinae